Briggs is an unincorporated community in Douglas County, Nebraska, United States.

History
A post office was established at Briggs in 1892, and remained in operation until it was discontinued in 1913.

References

Unincorporated communities in Douglas County, Nebraska
Unincorporated communities in Nebraska